The 2021-22 NBL season was the 50th season of the National Basketball League (England). This season marks the return of Division 2 and Division 3, after a one-year hiatus due to the COVID-19 pandemic. The league structure was announced in June 2021.

NBL Division 1

Team changes
Team changes
 BA London Lions to London Lions II

Teams

Regular season

Playoffs
Quarter-finals

Semi-finals

Final

NBL Division 2

Regular season

Playoffs
Quarter-finals

Semi-finals

Final

NBL Division 3

Regular season

Playoffs
First round

Quarter-finals

Semi-finals

Final

National Cup

First round

Second round

Third round

Fourth round

Quarter-finals

Semi-finals

Final

L Lynch Trophy
The 2021-22 L Lynch Trophy was the second edition of the competition. The same 16 teams as in 2020-21, the 14 NBL Division 1 sides and the Myerscough and Charnwood academy sides, were split into four regional groups. The top 2 sides from each group would advance to the quarter-finals, therein playing a knockout format to determine the overall winners.

Group stage

Group 1

Group 2

Group 3

Group 4

Quarter-finals

Semi-finals

Final

References

English Basketball League seasons
Basketball
Basketball
2021–22 in European second tier basketball leagues